Crostini (meaning "little crusts" in Italian; singular crostino) are an Italian appetizer consisting of small slices of grilled or toasted bread and toppings. The toppings may include a variety of different cheeses, meats, vegetables and condiments, or may be presented more simply with a brush of olive oil and herbs or a sauce.

Along with bruschetta, crostini are thought to originate in medieval times when it was typical for peasants to eat their meals on slices of bread instead of using ceramics.

See also
 Tapas
 List of hors d'oeuvre
 List of toast dishes

References

External links 

Italian cuisine
Appetizers
Toast dishes